William Lee Tracy (April 14, 1898 – October 18, 1968) was an American stage, film, and television actor. He is known foremost for his portrayals between the late 1920s and 1940s of fast-talking, wisecracking news reporters, press agents, lawyers, and salesmen. From 1949 to 1954, he was also featured in the weekly radio and television versions of the series Martin Kane: Private Eye, as well as starring as the newspaper columnist Lee Cochran in the 19581959 British-American crime drama New York Confidential. Later, in 1964, he was nominated for an Academy Award for Best Supporting Actor and a Golden Globe for his supporting role in the film The Best Man.

Early life and stage career
Born in 1898 in Atlanta, Georgia, Tracy was the only child of Ray (née Griffith) and William L. Tracy, a railroader. His father's profession often required the family to relocate, so young Tracy grew up in a variety of locations, including Atlanta, Louisville, Kansas City, St. Louis, and later Sayre, Pennsylvania, where his father was employed as superintendent of a locomotive shop. Lee during his teenage years studied at the Western Military Academy in Alton, Illinois and graduated from that preparatory school before briefly attending Union College in New York to pursue a degree in electrical engineering. His studies there were interrupted by his induction into the United States Army during the final weeks of World War I. Although he served in the army for only a short time, he quickly rose to the rank of second lieutenant, a promotion likely attributable to his prior education at Western Military Academy and to his knowledge in engineering. 

Soon after his discharge from the army, Tracy decided to alter his career plans, abandoning engineering and turning instead to acting and to working in local stage productions. As early as 1920, in that year's federal census for Pennsylvania, he officially identifies his occupation as "actor, theatrical company". His rise in the ranks in theatre, as in his brief military service, proved to be rapid. After performing for two years in productions with traveling companies, Tracy began performing regularly in vaudeville in New York, earning a steady salary of $35 a week. By 1924 he made his Broadway debut in the original production of George Kelly's play The Show-Off. Two years later, he starred in the hit production of Broadway, for which he received the New York Drama Critics Award. Then, in 1928, his stage performance as the "hard-drinking, fast talking" news reporter Hildy Johnson in the original Broadway production of The Front Page received widespread popular and critical acclaim.

Film career

In 1929, Tracy arrived in Hollywood, where he played a news reporter in several films, although he was not cast in that role for the 1931 screen version of The Front Page. Despite Tracy's success portraying the character Hildy Johnson in the Broadway production, the film's producers did not believe he possessed sufficient star power to attract large audiences to cinemas to see the comedy drama. They instead cast Pat O'Brien in the part. Undeterred, Tracy continued to gain admirers of his work among studio executives and moviegoers. In 1932 he again received praise for his portrayal of Alvin Roberts, a Walter Winchell-type gossip columnist, in Blessed Event (1932). That same year, he played Lupe Vélez's frenetic manager in Gregory LaCava's The Half-Naked Truth. The year 1933 attracted further attention to Tracy as he starred as a columnist in Advice to the Lovelorn and portrayed John Barrymore's agent in the director George Cukor's highly successful production Dinner at Eight.

Lee Tracy's flourishing film career was temporarily disrupted on 19 November 1933, while he was on location in Mexico filming Viva Villa! with Wallace Beery. According to the actor and producer Desi Arnaz, in his autobiography A Book (1976), Tracy stood on a balcony in Mexico City and urinated down onto a passing military parade.  Elsewhere in his autobiography, Arnaz claims that from then on, if one watched other crowds of spectators, they would visibly disperse any time an American stepped out onto a balcony.  However, other crew members there at the time disputed this story, giving a sharply different account of events. In his autobiography, Charles G. Clarke, the cinematographer on the picture, said that he was standing outside the hotel during the parade and the incident never happened. Tracy, he said, was standing on the balcony observing the parade when a Mexican in the street below made an obscene gesture at him. Tracy replied in kind; and the next day a local newspaper printed a story that, in effect, Tracy had insulted Mexico, Mexicans in general, and their national flag in particular. The story caused an uproar in Mexico, and MGM decided to remove Tracy from the production so authorities would allow the studio to continue filming there. The young actor Stuart Erwin replaced Tracy. The film's original director, Howard Hawks, was also fired from the project for his refusal to testify against Tracy. Jack Conway replaced him.

Radio and television
During World War II, Tracy returned to military service. His career after the war focused increasingly on radio work and performing on the rapidly expanding medium of television. Between 1949 and 1954, he performed on both the radio and televised versions of the weekly series Martin Kane: Private Eye, in which he was one of four actors to play the title role. In 1958, he returned to the role of newspaper reporter in the syndicated series New York Confidential. Tracy did continue to return periodically to the big screen. 
In 1964, he portrayed the former President of the United States "Art Hockstader", a fictitious character loosely based on Harry Truman, in both the stage and film adaptations of Gore Vidal's novel The Best Man. The movie version featured Henry Fonda and Cliff Robertson. Tracy received his only Academy Award nomination, as Best Supporting Actor, for his performance in the film.

Personal life and death
Tracy was married once. In July 1938, he wed Helen Thomas Wyse (also cited Wyze) in a small ceremony at the home of a Presbyterian minister in Yuma, Arizona. The couple remained together over 30 years, until Lee's death. They had no children.

Tracy's final acting performance was in the role of Father Maurice Britt in the Broadway production Minor Miracle in 1965. Three years later, after being diagnosed with advanced liver cancer, he underwent surgery at St. John's Hospital in Santa Monica, California to treat the disease. His condition following the operation steadily worsened over "several months", and on October 16, 1968, the 70-year-old actor had to re-enter the hospital, where he died two days later. He was buried beside his parents at Evergreen Cemetery in Shavertown, Pennsylvania.

Filmography

 Salute (1929) as Radio Announcer (uncredited)
 Big Time (1929) as Eddie Burns
 Born Reckless (1930) as Bill O'Brien
 Liliom (1930) as The Buzzard
 She Got What She Wanted (1930) as Eddie
 The Strange Love of Molly Louvain (1932) as Scotty Cornell
 Love Is a Racket (1932) as Stanley Fiske
 Doctor X (1932) as Lee Taylor
 The Night Mayor (1932) as Mayor Bobby Kingston
 Blessed Event (1932) as Alvin Roberts
 Washington Merry-Go-Round (1932) as Button Gwinnett Brown
 The Half-Naked Truth (1932) as Jimmy Bates
 Clear All Wires! (1933) as Buckley Joyce Thomas
 Private Jones (1933) as Pvt. William "Bill" Jones
 The Nuisance (1933) as Joseph Phineas "Joe" Stevens
 Dinner at Eight (1933) as Max Kane
 Turn Back the Clock (1933) as Joe Gimlet 
 Bombshell (1933) as Space Hanlon
 Advice to the Lovelorn (1933) as Toby Prentiss
 I'll Tell the World (1934) as Stanley Brown
 You Belong to Me (1934) as Bud Hannigan
 The Lemon Drop Kid (1934) as Wally Brooks 
 Carnival (1935) as Chick Thompson
 Two-Fisted (1935) as Hap Hurley
 Pirate Party on Catalina Isle (1935, Short) as Pirate (uncredited)
 Sutter's Gold (1936) as Pete Perkin
 Wanted! Jane Turner (1936) as Tom Mallory
 Criminal Lawyer (1937) as Brandon 
 Behind the Headlines (1937) as Eddie Haines 
 Crashing Hollywood (1938) as Michael Winslow 
 Fixer Dugan (1939) as Charlie "The Fixer" Dugan
 The Spellbinder (1939) as Jed Marlowe
 Millionaires in Prison (1940) as Nick Burton
 The Payoff (1942) as Brad McKay 
 Power of the Press (1943) as Griff Thompson
 Betrayal from the East (1945) as Eddie Carter
 I'll Tell the World (1945) as Gabriel Patton
 High Tide (1947) as Hugh Fresney 
 Come Out Fighting (1950, TV Movie) as Stick Keenan
 The Best Man (1964) as President Art Hockstader
 Steptoe and Son'' (1965, TV Movie) as Albert (final film role)

Radio appearances

References

External links

 
 
 Moviefone: Lee Tracy
 
 Lee Tracy: A Motormouth, Ambulance Chasing, Four Flusher (TCM Movie Morlocks)

1898 births
1968 deaths
American male film actors
American male stage actors
American male television actors
Deaths from cancer in California
Deaths from liver cancer
Male actors from Atlanta
20th-century American male actors
Union College (New York) alumni
Burials in Pennsylvania